The 1976 Atlanta Braves season was the 11th season in Atlanta along with the franchise's 106th consecutive year of existence in American professional baseball.  The Braves  finished in sixth and last place in the National League West Division, compiling a 70–92 (.432) win–loss record; although the 70 victories represented a three-game improvement over the fifth-place 1975 edition, the last-place finish would be the first of four straight years in the NL West divisional basement. The club drew 818,179 fans to Atlanta Stadium, a 53 percent increase over its dismal 1975 attendance of less than 535,000 fans.

Offseason 
 November 17, 1975: Dusty Baker and Ed Goodson were traded by the Braves to the Los Angeles Dodgers for Jerry Royster, Lee Lacy, Tom Paciorek, and Jimmy Wynn.
 December 12, 1975: Larvell Blanks and Ralph Garr were traded by the Braves to the Chicago White Sox for Ken Henderson, Ozzie Osborn and Dick Ruthven.

Ownership and management: the Ted Turner era begins
On January 7, 1976, the modern era of the Braves franchise effectively began when Atlanta broadcast executive and world-class yachtsman Ted Turner bought 100 percent of the team from the Atlanta LaSalle Corp. for $10 million. The previous ownership group, as the LaSalle Corp., had owned the team since October 1962 and spearheaded its move from Milwaukee to Atlanta in time for the  season; its chairman, William Bartholomay, retained his association with the Turner-owned Braves as chairman of the board. Early reports speculated that Turner bought the Braves to provide local programming content for his television station, then WTCG-TV, Channel 17.  But Turner would become a highly successful baseball executive and turn WTCG into the WTBS Superstation and a cornerstone of the Turner Broadcasting System.

Turner wasted no time in making headlines and major changes in the Braves' front office.  On April 11, 1976, he signed one of baseball's first free agents, starting pitcher Andy Messersmith, who had successfully sued baseball and brought about the end of the reserve clause, for a contract valued at more than $1 million. Messersmith, a 19-game-winner for the  Dodgers, was initially issued a uniform bearing the numeral 17 but the word "Channel" instead of his nameplate above it, promoting Turner's WTCG outlet. He made the NL All-Star team that season, his most successful as a Brave, and was one of the few bright spots in a 92-loss, last-place season. The team's field manager, Dave Bristol, hired by the previous owners three months before the sale, survived the 1976 season—but he would be involved in a bizarre firing-and-rehiring by Turner during the  campaign.

Turner also employed three general managers in 1976. In May, he replaced veteran baseball man Eddie Robinson, inherited from the previous regime and in office for almost four full years, with former Boston Red Sox executive John Alevizos.  But Alevizos lasted only four months before he was removed in favor of Braves' farm system director Bill Lucas, who became the first African-American general manager in Major League history on September 17.  Lucas, the former brother-in-law of Braves' legend Henry Aaron, would begin the rebuilding of the franchise into a competitor, but he died suddenly at age 43 from a cerebral hemorrhage in 1979, the year before the Braves finally cracked the .500 mark.

Led by stars such as Dale Murphy and Bob Horner, the early 1980s Braves featured a succession of successful teams, and won the 1982 National League West Division championship. But they declined precipitously in 1985, and after some very lean years in the late 1980s, Turner, working with a talented team of senior executives such as Bobby Cox, Stan Kasten and John Schuerholz, would turn the Braves into a perennial contender during the 1990s, and a nationally popular franchise on WTBS, where they styled themselves as "America's Team." They won consecutive division titles from 1991–1993 and 1995–1996, NL pennants in 1991, 1992, 1995 and 1996, and the 1995 World Series, before Turner sold the team and all of his Turner Broadcasting holdings to Time Warner in 1996.

Regular season

Season standings

Record vs. opponents

Notable transactions 
 June 8, 1976: 1976 Major League Baseball draft
Ricky Jones was drafted by the Braves in the 18th round, but did not sign.
John Butcher was drafted by the Braves in the 3rd round of the secondary phase, but did not sign.
 June 13, 1976: Darrell Evans and Marty Perez were traded by the Braves to the San Francisco Giants for Willie Montañez, Craig Robinson, Mike Eden, and Jake Brown.
 June 15, 1976: Blue Moon Odom was traded by the Braves to the Chicago White Sox for Pete Varney.
 June 23, 1976: Elías Sosa and Lee Lacy were traded by the Braves to the Los Angeles Dodgers for Mike Marshall.

Roster

Player stats

Batting

Starters by position 
Note: Pos = Position; G = Games played; AB = At bats; H = Hits; Avg. = Batting average; HR = Home runs; RBI = Runs batted in

Other batters 
Note: G = Games played; AB = At bats; H = Hits; Avg. = Batting average; HR = Home runs; RBI = Runs batted in

Pitching

Starting pitchers 
Note: G = Games pitched; IP = Innings pitched; W = Wins; L = Losses; ERA = Earned run average; SO = Strikeouts

Other pitchers 
Note: G = Games pitched; IP = Innings pitched; W = Wins; L = Losses; ERA = Earned run average; SO = Strikeouts

Relief pitchers 
Note: G = Games pitched; W = Wins; L = Losses; SV = Saves; ERA = Earned run average; SO = Strikeouts

Farm system 

LEAGUE CHAMPIONS: Greenwood

Notes

References 

1976 Atlanta Braves season at Baseball Reference
Atlanta Braves on Baseball Almanac

Atlanta Braves seasons
Atlanta Braves season
Atlanta